Platomma is a genus of tephritid  or fruit flies in the family Tephritidae.

Species
Platomma luniferum (Loew, 1861)
Platomma nigrantior Munro, 1963

References

Tephritinae
Tephritidae genera
Diptera of Africa